David Maurice Massey (born 1957) is a film maker and graduate of the American Film Institute. In 1992, he was nominated for an Academy Award for Best Live Action Short Film for the film Last Breeze of Summer. He is one of two African Americans to be nominated for a short film of any kind and the film won a Crystal Heart Award.

He has also received recognition by The National Education Association and is an inductee at The Black Filmmakers Hall of Fame. David Massey directed a short film about the Vietnam War which had Benjamin McKenzie before he got his starring role on the hit TV show The O.C.

References

External links
Island song the movie

1957 births
Living people
African-American film directors
American film directors
AFI Conservatory alumni
21st-century African-American people
20th-century African-American people